Maulvi Asmatullah  is a Pakistani politician who has been a member of the National Assembly of Pakistan since August 2018. Previously, he was a member of the National Assembly from 2008 to 2013.

Political career
He was elected to the National Assembly of Pakistan from Constituency NA-264 (Zhob-cum-Sherani-cum-Killa Saifullah) as an independent candidate in 2008 Pakistani general election. He received 24,204 votes and defeated Muhammad Khan Sherani.

He ran for the seat of the National Assembly from Constituency NA-264 (Zhob-cum-Sherani-cum-Killa Saifullah) as a candidate of Jamiat Ulama-e-Islam Nazryati in 2013 Pakistani general election but was unsuccessful. He received 27,514 votes and lost the seat to Muhammad Khan Sherani.

He was re-elected to the National Assembly as a candidate of from Muttahida Majlis-e-Amal (MMA) from Constituency NA-264 (Quetta-I) in 2018 Pakistani general election.

References

Living people
Pakistani MNAs 2008–2013
Pakistani MNAs 2018–2023
Year of birth missing (living people)